Dr Alannah Marie Halay (born 6 November 1990) is an internationally performed British composer and author known for her work with avant-garde, contemporary classical, and experimental music. Halay studied at the University of Leeds, where she received her PhD in composition. She is an Associate Fellow of the Higher Education Academy.

Career

Halay was born in Bradford, West Yorkshire.

She received a place at the University of Leeds via its Access to Leeds Scheme. She began her composing career as an undergraduate, when her piece Dry Veins (2012) for piano and voice was performed in the Leeds Lieder festival in 2012. During her PhD, she was the winner of the Yorkshire Young Sinfonia Composition Competition 2015, and her composition Air, Earth, Water, Fire was selected to be workshopped in its summer course and performed alongside its BBC Radio 4 programme. In the same year, she had a composition selected for the Gaudeamus Muziekweek Academy, which would be performed in the Gaudeamus Muziekweek Festival in 2016. Her music has been performed internationally, by musicians such as Ian Pace, Rui Baeta, Katharina Gross, Peter Wiegold (Notes Inégales), Ryszard Lubieniecki, and Lara Martins.

In 2017, she worked with Dr Michael Spencer to celebrate the University of Leeds becoming a Steinway School, with their piece Resonance/Light/Decay being composed to be played on twenty-eight Steinway pianos.

Throughout 2022, Halay worked with the Calouste Gulbenkian Foundation through the support of enoa (European Network of Opera Academies), which selected her upcoming opera project, Queering Opera, for its Opera Creation Journey programme. This follows her previous opera, Pacific Pleasures, which was written as a prequel to Leonard Bernstein's Trouble in Tahiti, and performed together by Bloomsbury Opera at Goodenough College in 2017.

Publications
Halay's practice-led research formed the basis of her PhD thesis, Recognising Absurdity through Compositional Practice: Comparing an Avant-Garde Style with being avant garde. The same methodology has informed her other publications, including her edited book, (Per)Forming Art: Performance as Research in Contemporary Artworks, published by Cambridge Scholars Publishing. Some of Halay's musical scores are available from the UCLA Music Library: Contemporary Music Score Collection. Halay is also published by Vernon Press and the University of Nebraska Press.

List of Compositions

Discography
 Parallax Error (2014): Katarina Gross, on Cellomondo #2: Rebirth in Sound (2018)
 We Lived in the Gaps between the Stories (2016): Ryszard Lubieniecki, on Seeds (2019)
 angustia (2015) and We Lived in the Gaps between the Stories (2016): Layers, on Grundgestein (2021)

Bibliography

 ‘(Per)Forming Art: Performance as a Compositional Technique’, in (Per)Forming Art: Performance as Research in Contemporary Artworks, ed. by Alannah Marie Halay (London: Cambridge Scholars Publishing, 2016), pp. 37–51.
 ‘New Music Biennial, Hull’, in Sounds Like Now: Contemporary Music News magazine
 ‘‘We Lived in the Gaps Between the Stories’ (2016) Amplified Accordion’, in Women and Music Journal (21: 2018)
 ‘“Xenakis, not Gounod”: Xenakis, the Avant Garde, and May ’68’, in Exploring Xenakis: Performance, Practice, Philosophy (Wilmington, DE: Vernon Press, 2019)
 ‘Parallax Error (2014) for any four-string bowed instrument' in UCLA Music Library: Contemporary Music Score Collection (2020)
 ‘The Interlocutor (2014) for Horn, Electric Guitar, Piano (& synthesizer), Electric Violin‘ in UCLA Music Library: Contemporary Music Score Collection (2020)
 ‘Air, Earth, Water, Fire (2015) for orchestra’ in UCLA Music Library: Contemporary Music Score Collection (2020)

References

External links
 
 

1990 births
Living people
21st-century British composers
21st-century classical composers
21st-century women composers
British women composers
Women classical composers
Alumni of the University of Leeds
People educated at St. Joseph's Catholic College, Bradford